Bilten railway station is a railway station in the Swiss canton of Glarus and municipality of Glarus Nord. The station is located on the Lake Zurich left-bank railway line, owned by the Swiss Federal Railways (SBB), and takes its name from the nearby village of Bilten.

Layout and connections 
Bilten has a  island platform with two tracks ( 3–4). PostAuto Schweiz operates bus services from the station to Ziegelbrücke and Pfäffikon.

Services 
 the following services stop at Bilten:

References

External links
 
 

Railway stations in the canton of Glarus
Swiss Federal Railways stations